59 Leonis, or c Leonis, is a single white-hued star in the southern part of the constellation of Leo. It is north of 58 Leonis, south of Chi Leonis, and well east of the bright star Regulus. Its apparent visual magnitude is 4.98, so it is dimly visible to the naked eye, 0.21 degree south of the ecliptic. The star is moving closer to the Sun with a heliocentric radial velocity of −12 km/s.

Cowley et al. (1969) assigned 59 Leonis a stellar classification of A5 III, matching the spectrum of an A-type giant star, but Gray and Garrison (1989) found a class of A6 IV, suggesting it is a subgiant star. Hauck (1986) noted that the star is classified as a giant, but the colors match a dwarf star and it had been previously classified as F3 V. It is an estimated 332 million years old with a high rate of spin, showing a projected rotational velocity of 82 km/s. The star has around 1.73 times the mass of the Sun and is radiating 18 times the Sun's luminosity from its photosphere at an effective temperature of about 8,277 K.

References

External links
 59 Leonis in Hipparcos stars in Leo

A-type giants
Leo (constellation)
Leonis, c
Durchmusterung objects
Leonis, 59
095382
053824
4294